Aristofusus helenae is a species of sea snail, a marine gastropod mollusk in the family Fasciolariidae.

Distribution
 Gulf of Mexico: off Florida

References

 Vermeij G.J. & Snyder M.A. (2018). Proposed genus-level classification of large species of Fusininae (Gastropoda, Fasciolariidae). Basteria. 82(4-6): 57-82.

External links
 Bartsch P. (1939). Two remarkable new species of marine shells from Florida. Smithsonian Miscellaneous Collections. 98(1): 1-3, 1 pl

helenae
Gastropods described in 1939